Thomas W. Hamilton may refer to:

 Thomas Watt Hamilton, perpetrator of the Dunblane massacre
 Thomas W. Hamilton (Medal of Honor), recipient of an American Civil War Medal of Honor
 Thomas William Hamilton (born 1939), author and participant in the Apollo program, after whom asteroid 4897 Tomhamilton was named